Alugolla is a village in Sri Lanka. It is located north of Miyanagolla and east of Dolosbage, within Kandy District, Central Province. It adjoins the Baranagala estate.

Demographics

See also
List of towns in Central Province, Sri Lanka

External links

References

Populated places in Kandy District